The 2015 Brentwood Borough Council election took place on 7 May 2015 to elect members of the Brentwood Borough Council in England. They were held on the same day as other local elections.

Summary Result

References

2015 English local elections
May 2015 events in the United Kingdom
2015
2010s in Essex